Rui Miguel Norinho Coelho (born 13 June 1987), known as Norinho, is a Portuguese former footballer who played as a forward. He made 15 appearances in the Segunda Liga for Gondomar.

References

External links

1987 births
Living people
People from Gondomar, Portugal
Sportspeople from Porto District
Portuguese footballers
Association football forwards
Liga Portugal 2 players
Segunda Divisão players
Gondomar S.C. players
FC Solothurn players
Portuguese expatriate footballers
Expatriate footballers in Switzerland
Portuguese expatriate sportspeople in Switzerland